Eupithecia hydrargyrea is a moth in the  family Geometridae. It is found in Madagascar.

References

Moths described in 1954
hydrargyrea
Moths of Madagascar